The Lilly Historic District in Lilly, Georgia is a  historic district which was listed on the National Register of Historic Places in 1998.  Roughly bounded by the CSX RR tracks, and Church, Montezuma, Third, and School Streets, it included 29 contributing buildings, two contributing structures, and a contributing site.  It also includes 11 non-contributing buildings and a non-contributing structure.

References

External links

Historic districts on the National Register of Historic Places in Georgia (U.S. state)
National Register of Historic Places in Dooly County, Georgia
Georgian architecture in Georgia (U.S. state)
Victorian architecture in Georgia (U.S. state)
Buildings and structures completed in 1902